Polyporus radicatus is a species of fungus in the family Polyporaceae. It was described as new to science by German-American botanist Lewis David de Schweinitz in 1832. It is found in North America, including Mexico. It grows on the ground, probably from buried roots or originating from sclerotia. Its spores are more or less ellipsoid to spindle shaped, measuring 12–15 by 6–8 µm. It is inedible.

References

Fungi described in 1832
Fungi of North America
Inedible fungi
radicatus